Loba (Spanish for she-wolf) is a popular South American card game.  It is popular in Argentina and Bolivia. It is a variant of Rummy.

External links

 Rules of Card Games: Loba (by John McLeod and Eduardo Valcarcel)

South American card games
French deck card games